Of Time, Work, and Leisure is a 1962 book by Pulitzer prize-winning political scientist Sebastian de Grazia about the role of what he calls "work time", "free time", and "leisure time" in society.  De Grazia argues that even though the average work day and work week are shorter, and technology frees up time for workers,  the average worker has less free time today than they did in the past.

References

Bibliography
De Grazia, S. (1962). Of Time, Work, and Leisure. The Twentieth Century Fund.  New York. 
Hemingway, J. L. (1988). Leisure and Civility: Reflections on a Greek Ideal. Leisure Sciences. 10 (3), 179-191.
Maciver, R. M. (October 5, 1962). Tyranny of the Clock: The Need To Enjoy What One Does Cannot Be Overestimated. Science. 138 (3536), 23-24. 
Willhoite, F. H. (1963). Book Reviews: Of Time, Work, and Leisure. The Journal of Politics. Southern Political Science Association. 25 (2), 382-383.

Further reading
Anton, C. (2009). "Clocks, Synchronization, and the Fate of Leisure: A Brief Media Ecological History of Digital Technologies." In Sharon Kleinman (Ed.), The Culture of Efficiency: Technology in Everyday Life. Peter Lang. .
Simon, Y. R. (1999). "Leisure and Culture". Real Democracy. Lanham, Maryland. Rowman & Littlefield Publishers, Inc. 

1962 non-fiction books